Greg Koch may refer to:

Greg Koch (born June 14, 1955), American Football player
Greg Koch (musician) (born June 23, 1966), American musician - guitar player
Greg Koch Brewing company executive

See also 
Koch (disambiguation)